Brian Leslie Ford Roberts (born 6 November 1955), commonly known by his nickname Harry Roberts, is an English former professional footballer who played as a defender. He made more than 400 appearances in the Football League for Coventry City, Hereford United, Birmingham City and Wolverhampton Wanderers.

After ten years as a professional at Coventry City he joined Birmingham City for a fee of £10,000 raised through a supporters' "Buy a Player Fund". He won the club's Player of the Year award for 1989. Nicknamed "Harry" after the 1960s police-killer Harry Roberts, he published an autobiography entitled Harry's Game.

He went on to coach at Coventry City before becoming head of sport at a private school in Leamington Spa.

Honours
Birmingham City
 Football League Second Division runners-up: 1984–85

References

External links
 

Living people
1955 births
Footballers from Manchester
English footballers
Association football defenders
Coventry City F.C. players
Hereford United F.C. players
Birmingham City F.C. players
Wolverhampton Wanderers F.C. players
English Football League players